Anton Pliesnoi (born 17 September 1996) is a Georgian and Ukrainian weightlifter competing in the 94 kg division until 2018 and 96 kg  starting in 2018 after the International Weightlifting Federation reorganized the categories.

Career
In 2012 Anton performed for the first time at the European Youth Championship in Ukraine's squad, where he took fifth place in -77 kg category lifting 275 kg. Since 2018 he represents Georgia.

He competed at the 2019 European Weightlifting Championships winning a bronze medal in the total.

Major results

References

External links 
 

1996 births
Living people
Male weightlifters from Georgia (country)
World Weightlifting Championships medalists
European Weightlifting Championships medalists
Weightlifters at the 2020 Summer Olympics
Medalists at the 2020 Summer Olympics
Olympic medalists in weightlifting
Olympic bronze medalists for Georgia (country)
Olympic weightlifters of Georgia (country)